Deniss Vasiļjevs (born 9 August 1999) is a Latvian figure skater. He is the 2022 European bronze medalist, the 2022 MK John Wilson Trophy silver medalist, a four-time ISU Challenger Series medalist (including gold at the 2020 CS Nebelhorn Trophy), and a five-time Latvian national champion (2016–18, 2020, 2022).

Earlier in his career, Vasiļjevs became the 2016 Youth Olympics silver medalist and won two silver medals on the ISU Junior Grand Prix (JGP) series. He is the first Latvian skater to make the podium at a JGP event and at an ISU Championships event.

Personal life
Deniss Vasiļjevs was born on 9 August 1999 in Daugavpils, Latvia. His mother is a former dancer. In 2016, he began living in Champery, Switzerland, but remained a student at Daugavpils Russian Secondary School – Lyceum. He enjoys drawing and speaks four languages – Latvian, Russian, French and English.

Career
Vasiļjevs began skating in 2002. As he was often sick, his parents decided to involve him in a sport, first considering swimming and then skating. Around 2010, they arranged for him to train under the guidance of Lithuanian coach Ingrida Snieškienė in Paris, France. Due to his schooling, he spent part of the year training in Daugavpils. His figure skating role models include Stéphane Lambiel, Daisuke Takahashi, Patrick Chan, and Javier Fernández.

2013–14 season: Junior international debut
Vasiļjevs debuted on the ISU Junior Grand Prix circuit in 2013, placing 7th in Riga, Latvia and 10th in Gdańsk, Poland. He was named in Latvia's team to the World Junior Championships, held in March 2014 in Sofia, Bulgaria. Ranked 11th in the short program, he qualified for the free skate, where he placed 7th, pulling him up to 8th overall.

2014–15 season
During the 2014–15 figure skating season, Vasiļjevs placed fourth at both of his Junior Grand Prix assignments, in Courchevel, France and Tallinn, Estonia. He won the silver medal at the European Youth Olympic Winter Festival, held in January 2015 in Dornbirn, Austria. He began working with Alexei Urmanov before the 2015 World Junior Championships, which took place in March in Tallinn, Estonia. He placed 8th in both segments and 7th overall.

2015–16 season: Senior international debut
Vasiļjevs began the 2015–16 season by winning silver at both of his JGP events in Riga, Latvia and Toruń, Poland. He is the first Latvian skater to step on a JGP podium. Making his senior international debut, he placed 5th at the 2015 Mordovian Ornament before taking the bronze medal at the 2015 Tallinn Trophy.

In January 2016, Vasiļjevs was sent to his first senior ISU Championship – the 2016 Europeans in Bratislava, Slovakia. He finished 12th after placing 14th in the short program and 10th in the free skate. In February, he competed in Hamar, Norway at the 2016 Youth Olympics. Ranked third in the short program and first in the free skate, he finished second overall with a total score 1.09 less than gold medalist Sōta Yamamoto of Japan. His silver is Latvia's first Youth Olympic medal in figure skating. Vasiļjevs was assigned to compete in the mixed NOC team event as a member of Team Discovery. Placing first in his segment, he lifted his team to the bronze medal.

By 2016, Vasiļjevs was training almost full-time with Urmanov in Sochi, Russia. In March, at the 2016 World Junior Championships in Debrecen, Hungary, he won a small bronze medal for the short program and finished 8th overall. Later that month, he competed at the 2016 World Championships in Boston. He qualified for the free skate by placing tenth in the short program and finishing 14th overall.

2016–17 season
In spring 2016, Vasiļjevs had new programs choreographed by Stéphane Lambiel in Champéry, Switzerland. He was diagnosed with a tear in his left adductor muscle during the off-season and visited Toronto in late July 2016 for physiotherapy. On 25 August 2016, he announced that Lambiel had agreed to coach him in Champéry. He started practicing double jumps in early September. He also worked on developing his program details, steps, and spins.

In November, Vasiljevs made his Grand Prix debut. He placed 11th at the 2016 Rostelecom Cup and then 6th at the 2016 NHK Trophy. He ranked 6th in both segments and 7th overall at the 2017 European Championships in Ostrava, Czech Republic. In March, he won his first international senior gold medal at the 2017 Cup of Tyrol. He finished 14th at the 2017 World Championships in Helsinki, Finland. Due to his result, Latvia qualified a spot in the men's event at the 2018 Winter Olympics in Pyeongchang, South Korea.

2017–18 season
Vasiļjevs began his season in September, finishing 4th at Lombardia Trophy. He finished in 8th place at Rostelecom Cup. In November, he was ninth in the short program at NHK Trophy but placed fifth in the free skate and climbed to 6th overall. He went on to win gold at Cup of Tyrol for the second time.

In December, Vasiļjevs won his third national title, and along with Diāna Ņikitina, was subsequently selected to represent Latvia in figure skating at the 2018 Winter Olympics. At the 2018 European Championships in January, he placed third in the short program and earned a small bronze medal. He was fifth in the free skating after falling on a downgraded quad toe loop and finished fourth, matching the record finishes of Angelīna Kučvaļska and Konstantīns Kostins at previous European Championships.

At the 2018 Winter Olympics, Vasiļjevs was twenty-first after the short program after falling on a triple Axel. In the free skating, he fell again on a triple Axel and another element, but was able to move up to nineteenth place. In March, Vasiļjevs competed at the World Championships, where he skated a clean short program and placed ninth. In the free skate, he set a new personal best and national record to finish sixth overall. His sixth-place finish is the highest ever placement by any skater representing Latvia in any discipline at Worlds.

2018–19 season

In October, Vasiljevs competed at Japan Open, placing fifth in his segment but winning silver as part of team Europe. He placed eighth at NHK Trophy and seventh at the Internationaux de France. He was scheduled to compete at Golden Spin in December but withdrew due to illness.

Vasiljevs placed eleventh at the 2019 European Championships and twenty-first at the 2019 World Championships.

2019–20 season
To begin the season, Vasiljevs won the bronze medal at the 2019 CS Ondrej Nepela Memorial, the second Challenger medal of his career.  He began on the Grand Prix at the 2019 Skate Canada International, placing fourth in the short program after putting a foot down on his triple Lutz.  He came seventh in the free skate, dropping to fifth place overall.  He was sixth at the 2019 Rostelecom Cup.

Next competing at the 2020 European Championships, Vasiljevs placed fifth in the short program despite still having a twisted ankle.  He was seventh in the free skate with a few underrotated jumps and slipped to sixth place overall.  He then won a gold medal at the Nordic Championships, which proved to be his final competition of the season, as the 2020 World Championships were cancelled as a result of the coronavirus pandemic.

2020–21 season
Vasiljevs began the season at the 2020 CS Nebelhorn Trophy, which, due to pandemic-related travel restrictions, was attended only by skaters from and training in Europe; Vasiljevs was considered one of the pre-event favourites.  Only fifth in the short program, he won the free skate and the gold medal, in the process landing a quad Salchow for the first time.  Vasiljevs was also assigned to compete at the 2020 Internationaux de France, but this event was also cancelled as a result of the pandemic.

Vasiljevs placed eighteenth at the 2021 World Championships in Stockholm. This result qualified one men's berth for Latvia at the 2022 Winter Olympics in Beijing.

2021–22 season
Vasiljevs began the season at the Olympic test event, the 2021 Asian Open, where he placed fourth. His first Grand Prix event was scheduled to be the 2021 Cup of China, but following its cancellation, he was reassigned to the 2021 Gran Premio d'Italia in Turin. He was fourth at that event as well with new person bests in the free skate and total score, and praised the "overwhelming feeling" of competing for an audience again. At his second event, the 2021 Internationaux de France, Vasiljevs was second in the short program with a new personal best score. Seventh in the free skate after errors on both his quad Salchow attempt and one of his triple Axels, he again finished fourth overall while still setting new personal bests again. 

At the 2022 European Championships, Vasiljevs placed sixth after the short program, skating cleanly. In the free skate, Vasiljevs landed a quad Salchow and skated the rest of his program cleanly to rise to bronze medal position in the free skate and overall, making the podium for the first time at Europeans. He improved his personal best scores in all segments at the event, and his medal marked the first medal for Latvia at the European Championships in any discipline. He called it "a milestone in my journey that I don’t know where it leads."

Named to his second Latvian team for the 2022 Winter Olympics, Vasiljevs placed sixteenth in the short program of the men's event. Twelfth in the free skate, despite a fall on his quad attempt, Vasiljevs rose to thirteenth place overall. He was thirteenth as well at the 2022 World Championships.

2022–23 season
Vasiljevs worked extensively with choreographer Salome Brunner on his short program to Sting's "Englishman in New York", saying, "I never before put that much of myself into a program." He won the bronze medal at the 2022 CS Nepela Memorial to start the season before finishing tenth at the 2022 Skate Canada International. Vasiljevs rallied from this disappointing result and won the silver medal at his second Grand Prix, the 2022 MK John Wilson Trophy. This was the first Grand Prix medal of his career and the first for a Latvian skater. Speaking on the subject, he said he was "very happy today that I had the first Latvian Grand Prix medal, but that's not the focus that I feel the most satisfied. It's a feeling, the standing ovation, the people cheering, the clapping...this energy is something way above, something way beyond what you get just by achieving something."

Seeking to defend his podium place at the 2023 European Championships, Vasiljevs finished third in the short program despite underrotating part of his jump combination, winning a small bronze medal. He said that in his own mind "I wasn't defending anything. I was skating for my own joy." The free skate proved more difficult, making an error on his quad attempt and underrotating two other triple jumps, dropping him to fifth overall.

Programs

Competitive highlights 

GP: Grand Prix; CS: Challenger Series; JGP: Junior Grand Prix

Detailed results

Senior level
Small medals for short and free programs awarded only at ISU Championships. At team events, medals awarded for team results only.

Bold scores are personal best.

References

External links 

 
 

1999 births
Latvian male single skaters
Living people
Sportspeople from Daugavpils
Latvian people of Russian descent
Figure skaters at the 2016 Winter Youth Olympics
Figure skaters at the 2018 Winter Olympics
Olympic figure skaters of Latvia
Figure skaters at the 2022 Winter Olympics